Peridaedala japonica is a species of moth of the family Tortricidae. It is found in Taiwan, Korea, Japan and the Russian Far East.

References

Moths described in 1979
Eucosmini